Scorched is an  Australian television movie broadcast on the Nine Network on 31 August 2008. The telemovie was titled Strike Team, which was ultimately as a decoy due to the state government having been uncomfortable about the premise and plot of the script. Scorched won the International Emmy Award for Digital Program: Fiction in 2009.

Synopsis
Scorched looks at the problems of climate change and water scarcity in the near future. The year is 2012, and after over 240 days without rain, Sydney has only two weeks of water left.

As a state of emergency is declared when a ring of bushfires erupt around the city, a reporter uncovers a conspiracy behind the water crisis.

Plot

It is several days before Christmas in 2012, and Sydney is in the midst of a water crisis. Despite the creation of a desalination plant, which NSW Premier Angela Boardman insists creates millions of litres of fresh water a day, the city is still under Level 8 water restrictions. The western suburbs especially are seriously dry.

Ambitious CPN reporter Susan Shapiro launches an investigation into the crisis. Her report catches the attention of the Premier, who grants Shapiro an interview. Although Shapiro is amicable (perhaps too much so - her cameraman Teddy accuses her of turning into Oprah), she is still suspicious. And with good reason; later conversation between Boardman and her Chief of Staff Tom Daily reveal they are sharing a secret that could end both their careers.

David Langmore, the State Operations Commander for the National Fire Service, is preparing dinner when he receives a call from Shapiro. He is angry that the reporter has called him at home and insists the water shortage has been caused solely by a lack of rain.

ER doctor Michael Francia is enjoying some quiet time with his pregnant wife Lizzie when Emily, his daughter from a previous relationship, shows up on his door. She has had a fight with her mother and needs a place to stay, even though, as she later confesses to her stepmother Lizzie, she isn't sure if her father likes her.

Meanwhile, a lightning storm forms over a national park in the western outskirts of Sydney. A bolt of lightning strikes a tree, which bursts into flames. The dry bushland quickly ignites.

The next day at work, Dr Francia is frantically trying to attend to an influx of patients suffering dehydration and heat exhaustion. A courier truck, carrying dozens of gas cylinders, speeds into the hospital car park and a bloodied man is dragged into the hospital lobby. During the commotion that follows, the truck outside is forgotten about and unbeknownst to anyone, one of the cylinders begins to leak.

David Langmore is monitoring the fires in the hopes that his team can prevent them from becoming fireheads. Volunteer firefighters, including David's son Brendan and Brendan's girlfriend Deanna, are sent out to control the blaze. Deanna and two other volunteers are overwhelmed by the size and ferocity of the flames and attempt to escape by car. Langmore and the rest of the workers in the control centre watch helplessly via closed circuit cameras as the fire consumes the car and the three perish.

It becomes apparent that they have a crisis on hand. The Premier announces a state of emergency and Langmore calls a Section 44, enacting that section of the Rural Fires Act 1997 (NSW); the effect of which means all emergency workers in the area are now under his control. Police and firefighters struggle to fight the flames but are deterred by a lack of water and pressure in the hoses.

Lizzie Francia receives a call from her invalid mother. Although Lizzie is concerned, she refuses Emily's offer to collect her mother from her nursing home. Emily sneaks away while Lizzie is dealing with a concerned neighbour. However, she encounters a detour and ends up driving close to the fire. She runs to escape the smoke but falls down a rocky hill and loses consciousness.

Shapiro reports from the frontlines. When firefighters try to tap into a residential water tank, the elderly owner becomes incensed and has a heart attack. Shapiro and Teddy take the man to the hospital, where they meet Dr Francio. They encourage him to tell his wife to evacuate. Shapiro also meets the brother of one of Boardman's political opponents and discovers that she received a large, anonymous donation a month before the election.

Francio calls his wife and urges her to evacuate. Mid-conversation, the leaking gas cylinder in the courier truck explodes. Francio miraculously survives, but several people in the hospital are injured. Lizzie, meanwhile, is forced to evacuate on foot. When she runs into Shapiro, Lizzie begs the reporter to take her two small children in the news helicopter. Shapiro agrees.

Langmore meets with the Premier and insists that they use the water from the desalination plant. Boardman refuses his request. Reluctantly, they resort to using saltwater (which can cause irreparable damage to nature) and the blaze is eventually extinguished.

Emily is found and receives medical attention. Francio rushes to be by her side and promises that he likes her 'with all (his) heart.'

Upon hearing that over 300 people have died, Daily sends Shapiro a video text message. The video reveals that the Premier made a deal with Argon Energy that gave them unlimited fresh water in return for free power to the desalination plants and one million dollars. Shapiro and Teddy are killed when a factory she is reporting from explodes, releasing toxic gases; however, when Langmore checks his email later that afternoon, he finds a video message from the reporter, with the subject line, 'Guess what? Sometimes it isn't just about the weather.'

Later, Boardman calls a press conference to discuss the tragic bushfires. Langmore attends. He asks her questions about the deal with Argon, which Boardman naturally denies. Langmore angrily calls her a liar and tells her that he has a video of their meeting. He gives members of the press copies of the video and Boardman flees the conference.

In the final scene, Langmore visits Shapiro's grave. It is revealed that Boardman was forced to resign as premier and Shapiro received a posthumous Walkley Award for investigative journalism... and that, eight weeks after the tragedy, Sydney still hasn't received rain.

Cast
 Cameron Daddo as David Langmore (State Operations Commander for the National Fire Service)
 Rachael Carpani as Susan Shapiro (Journalist for CPN News)
 Vince Colosimo as Dr. Michael Francia (Doctor at Baulkham Hills Public Hospital)
 Georgie Parker as Angela Boardman (Premier of New South Wales)
 Libby Tanner as Lizzie Francia (wife of Dr. Michael Francia)
 Bob Morley as Brendan Langmore (son of David Langmore, and volunteer firefighter)
 Alexandra Fowler as Kate Langmore (wife of David Langmore)
 Les Hill as Tom Daily (Chief of Staff to the Premier)
 Brittany Byrnes as Deanna Pearce (girlfriend of Brendan Langmore)
 Anita Hegh as Linda (National Fire Service officer)
 Kathryn Beck as Emily Francia (daughter of Dr. Michael Francia and stepdaughter of Lizzie Francia)
 Ben Oxenbould as Lenny (volunteer firefighter)
 Simon Maiden as Teddy (cameraman for Susan Shapiro)
 Mark McCann as Darren
 Brendan Donoghue as Gabe
 Justin Rosniak as policeman
 Salvatore Coco as Richard (National Fire Service officer)
 Karl Beattie as Ben Francia (son of Dr. Michael & Lizzie Francia)
 Lucia Mundell as Lilli Francia (daughter of Dr. Michael & Lizzie Francia)
 Kate Bell as Cassie Hoffman (local resident)
 Zachary Garred as Jade Hall (boyfriend of Cassie Hoffman)
 Drew Jarvis as Ewen Trembly

Related media
The weeks leading up to the broadcast of the telemovie saw a major online viral marketing campaign, with a number of websites and YouTube accounts created specifically to promote the telemovie by highlighting specific events, organisations and characters featured in the film.

The official website takes the guise of the homepage for CPN (Cross Platform News), a fictional news network from 2012 which is featured in the film. Websites for the fictional New South Wales Premier Angela Boardman, a fictional resident action group RAWT (Residents Against Water Theft), and the fictional companies Argon Energy and the H20 water transport group were also put online.

The official website also allows users to view online prequel and sequel webisodes, and add some of the characters as friends on Facebook.

References

External links 
 
 

2008 television films
2008 films
Australian television films
Nine Network original programming
Films about water
Films set in Sydney
Australian post-apocalyptic films
Television pilots not picked up as a series
Television films as pilots
Films about water scarcity
Films scored by Guy Gross
Films set in 2012
Films set in 2013
Films set in the future
Films directed by Tony Tilse